Marlborough Street is a street in the city centre of Dublin, Ireland.

Naming
The street was named Great Marlborough Street after the 1st Duke of Marlborough, known for his victory at the Battle of Blenheim during the 18th century. In the late 19th century it was for a time called Tyrone Street after Tyrone House. The lower part of the street was at different times called Union Lane, Ferryboat Lane, and Union Street.

Buildings
One of the principal buildings on this street is St Mary's Pro-Cathedral, designed by John Sweetman, and completed in 1825. Other buildings include offices of the Department of Education and Skills.

There is also what used to be a depot belonging to the Dublin United Tramways Company. Dublin Bus now use the premises.

Towards the junction with Parnell Street, there is the 1970s 8-storey office block, Telephone House designed by Brian Hogan. 13 tenement buildings with shops were demolished to make way for development. Far higher than most of the neighbouring buildings, it has been largely seen as having a negative impact on the streetscape, including vistas from the nearby North Great George's Street.

Marlborough Street was the location of the original St. Thomas’s Church which was damaged in 1922.

Luas

Marlborough Luas stop on the street is on the Green Line. Construction started in June 2013, with services beginning on 9 December 2017. Being near the Red line Abbey street stop it is a key interchange point on the two Luas lines.

See also

List of streets and squares in Dublin

References

Streets in Dublin (city)